Tale of the Navajos is a 1949 American documentary film written by Harry Chandlee and John A. Haeseler. The film was released on March 3, 1949, by Metro-Goldwyn-Mayer.

Synopsis

References

External links 
 

1949 films
American documentary films
1949 documentary films
Black-and-white documentary films
Metro-Goldwyn-Mayer films
American black-and-white films
1940s English-language films
1940s American films